Melas was a town of ancient Greece on the island of Naxos. It is cited, along with Elaeus, in an ancient inscription dated to the 3rd century BCE.

Its site is tentatively located near modern Melanes.

References

Populated places in the ancient Aegean islands
Former populated places in Greece
Ancient Naxos